Joru Ka Ghulam is a Pakistani drama television series that aired on Geo Tv from 13 July to 21 October 2016. It was produced by Babar Javed.

Synopsis

The story is about a strict man, Moazzam, and his family. Moazzam is strict because of the people who attacked his family when his sister left her house due to her love. Moazzam began to hate women. He argued with his second wife, Uzma, over small matters. His children ignore his misbehavior.

Moazzam has four sons, Sarbuland, Balaj, Waleed and Saadi. Moazzam's anger causes unhappiness among his sons' wives, who then pressure the sons to leave home so they might enjoy a peaceful life. The men are unwilling to go against their mother, Uzma, and she does not want them to leave.

Elder son Sarbuland is initially married to an educated lady, Sharmeen. They move away from the father's house because of Moazzam. Sharmeen dies shortly thereafter in a car accident prompting Sarbuland to return to his father's house. He returns to the way he lived before the marriage.

Second son Balaj married his college love, Suhaina, without Moazzam becoming aware this is the son's love. When he discovers this, he forces Balaj to divorce Suhaina. After the divorce, Suhaina marries an uneducated boy Mitho, the cousin of Naghma (Waleed's wife). Balaj comes to realize his mistake in divorcing Suhaina, and goes to Mitho's house to ask Suhaina to marry him once. However, Suhaina refuses, as she is happy with Mitho. After this, Balaj ended up alone, while Mitho and Suhaina move to Dubai.

Third son Waleed who was forced to marry an uneducated, greedy and traitorous woman. Uzma is not happy with this marriage, as Waleed is in love with his business partner, Beena.  Waleed obeyed his father's order and married his servant's daughter Naghma. Naghma's conservative background made her greedy and she wants that either Waleed or herself should own the entire Moazzam's property. For this purpose she made evil plans to irritate Moazzam about the rest of his family. Her husband Waleed went to Lahore in order to marry Beena, but she did not agree. Waleed came back home when Naghma bore a baby boy Raza and started taking interest in his father's business.

Fourth son Saadi, who is mentally ill, married Natasha. Natasha, annoyed by his husband behavior, left him but soon Saadi brought her back.

All the sons get on a single platform when doctor says that Moazzam has terminal cancer. Moazzam realizes that he did wrong with his family and begs their forgiveness. In the end, Moazzam died.

Cast

Mehmood Aslam as Moazzam
Ghazala Butt as Uzma
Kanwar Arsalan as Balaj
Fatima Effendi as Suhaina
Kamran Jilani as Sarbuland
Asad Siddiqui as Waleed
Hadi Firdous as Saadi
Sadia Ghaffar as Naghma
Minal Khan as Natasha
Natasha Ali as Sharmeen
Salahuddin Teeno
Anam Tanveer
Sarfaraz Ashraf as Mitho
Shehzad ali khan
Rozin Ulfat
Khalid Zafar
Raeed Muhammad Alam as Ghazali
Shazia Qaiser

See also
 List of Pakistani television series
 List of programs broadcast by Geo Entertainment

References

External links

2016 Pakistani television series debuts
A&B Entertainment